Revelations of the Unsung is the debut album by Florida metal band The Autumn Offering. It was released in 2004 through Stillborn Records and re-released in 2006 through Victory Records. Due to popularity with signing to Victory Records, since its conception, Revelations of the Unsung has sold in excess of 20,000 CDs.

A music video was made for the song "Revelation".

Track listing

Personnel
The Autumn Offering
Dennis Miller - vocals
George Moore - lead/rhythm guitars, vocals
Sean Robbins - bass guitar
Matt Johnson - rhythm/lead guitars
Nick Gelyon - drums

Additional personnel
Zeuss Ball - engineering, mixing
Aaron Marsh - additional imagery, art direction
Philip Labonte - additional vocals on "Homecoming"
Matt Deis - keyboards on "Revelation"

References

2004 debut albums
The Autumn Offering albums
Stillborn Records albums
Victory Records albums